Turbonilla insularis is a species of sea snail, a marine gastropod mollusk in the family Pyramidellidae, the pyrams and their allies.

Description
The shell grows to a length of 7.1 mm.

Distribution
This marine species occurs off Puerto Rico, Venezuela and Curaçao

References

External links
 To Biodiversity Heritage Library (1 publication)
 To Encyclopedia of Life
 To USNM Invertebrate Zoology Mollusca Collection
 To ITIS
 To World Register of Marine Species

insularis
Gastropods described in 1901